Modev Peak is the mostly ice-covered peak rising to 665 m on Two Hummock Island in the Palmer Archipelago, Antarctica.  The feature has precipitous and partly ice-free northwest slopes, and overlooks Urania Cove on the west and Kotev Cove on the north.  It is one of the two ‘hummocks’ that gave the name of the island.

The peak is named after Stanimir Modev, mechanic at St. Kliment Ohridski base in 2002/03 and subsequent seasons.

Location
British mapping in 1978.

Maps
 British Antarctic Territory.  Scale 1:200000 topographic map.  DOS 610 Series, Sheet W 64 60.  Directorate of Overseas Surveys, UK, 1978.
 Antarctic Digital Database (ADD). Scale 1:250000 topographic map of Antarctica. Scientific Committee on Antarctic Research (SCAR). Since 1993, regularly upgraded and updated.

Notes

References
 Bulgarian Antarctic Gazetteer. Antarctic Place-names Commission. (details in Bulgarian, basic data in English)
 Modev Peak. SCAR Composite Antarctic Gazetteer.

External links
 Modev Peak. Copernix satellite image

Mountains of the Palmer Archipelago
Bulgaria and the Antarctic
Two Hummock Island